The Bishop of St Albans is the Ordinary of the Church of England's Diocese of St Albans in the Province of Canterbury. The bishop is supported in his work by two suffragan bishops, the Bishop of Hertford and the Bishop of Bedford, and three archdeacons.

The diocese covers the counties of Bedfordshire and Hertfordshire, as well as parts of the London Borough of Barnet. The see is in the City of St Albans in Hertfordshire, where the cathedra (bishop's seat) is located at St Albans Cathedral. The cathedral building itself was an abbey church (part of St Albans Abbey) prior to the Dissolution of the Monasteries. Following its purchase by the town in 1553, it was then a parish church until its elevation to cathedral status in 1877, when the diocese was created from the diocese of Rochester under Queen Victoria by the Bishopric of St. Albans Act 1875.

Incumbent
The current incumbent is Alan Smith, 10th Bishop of St Albans, who signs + Alan St Albans. His nomination was announced by Downing Street on 13 January 2009, following the retirement of Christopher Herbert. Smith's election as bishop by the College of Canons of the Cathedral took place on 13 February and his Confirmation of Election with the Archbishop of Canterbury Rowan Williams followed on 31 March, at which point he legally took office as bishop. Smith was enthroned on 19 September 2009.

The Bishop's residence is the Abbey Gate House, St Albans.

List of bishops

Assistant bishops
Among those who have served as assistant bishops in the diocese are:
19141924 (ret.): Noel Hodges, former Bishop of Travancore and Cochin and Assistant Bishop of Durham and of Ely
19241934 (d.): Gerard Lander, Vicar of Holy Trinity New Barnet (until 1933), Archdeacon of Bedford (after 1933), and former Bishop of Victoria
19421951 (ret.): Bernard Heywood, Canon Residentiary of St Albans Abbey and retired Bishop of Ely
1961–1968 (res.): John Boys, Canon of St Albans and former Bishop of Kimberley and Kuruman

References

Bibliography
 
 Whitaker's Almanack 1883 to 2004, Joseph Whitaker and Sons Ltd/A&C Black, London.

St Albans
 
St Albans
Diocese of St Albans